In Greek mythology, Himas or Himantes was the father of Plouto and grandfather of Tantalus.

Note

References 
 Gaius Julius Hyginus, Fabulae from The Myths of Hyginus translated and edited by Mary Grant. University of Kansas Publications in Humanistic Studies. Online version at the Topos Text Project.

Anatolian characters in Greek mythology